LGBTIQ+ Health Australia (formerly the National LGBTI Health Alliance) is a peak health organisation for LGBT and intersex organisations in Australia. A not-for-profit company, it was established in August 2007.

Key areas of activity 

Key focus areas include ageing, mental health, suicide prevention, intersex health, transgender health, and data collection.

Ageing 

The organisation led consultations on an inclusive aged care strategy for the Department of Health that helped lead to the development of a national strategy.

Intersex health 

In 2013, the Alliance called for the implementation of the recommendations of a Senate Committee report on the 'Involuntary or coerced sterilisation of intersex people'. The Alliance had earlier made submissions and participated in a hearing on the issue.

Mental health and suicide prevention 

A major report on mental health and suicide prevention, prepared by PricewaterhouseCoopers, was published in August 2011. The report found that "there are higher levels of depression, anxiety and other mental health problems in the LGBTI populations, with evidence suggesting attempted suicide is 3.5 to 14 times" higher.

In September 2013, the Alliance joined a national campaign calling for a "National LGBTI Suicide Prevention Strategy", with the aim of halving suicide rates by 2023.

Trans and intersex health issues 
The Alliance launched a report on trans and intersex health issues at the federal Parliament House in November 2012. With Organisation Intersex International Australia, the Alliance was also consulted by the Department of Health and Ageing leading to improvements in access to Medicare services, reported in July 2013.

Health in Difference national conference 

The Alliance organises a biannual conference, Health in Difference. The 2013 conference was held in Melbourne in April. Plenary sessions were recorded by JOY 94.9.

Executive director
In late 2013, Warren Talbot announced his resignation as executive director, due to health reasons, and Andrew Little was appointed as acting executive director. Rebecca Reynolds, formerly the manager of Twenty10 took up the position in February 2014.

Member organisations 

Member organisations include: 
 A Gender Agenda (ACT)
 ACON
 Androgen Insensitivity Syndrome Support Group Australia
 Australian Federation of AIDS Organisations
 The Freedom Centre (WA)
 Organisation Intersex International Australia
 Queensland AIDS Council
 Transgender Victoria
 Thorne Harbour Health
 Victorian Pride Lobby
 Working It Out (Tasmania)
 Western Australian AIDS Council
 GRAI (WA) - GLBTI Rights in Ageing Inc

Affiliations
LGBTIQ+ Health Australia is a member of the Young and Well Co-operative Research Centre and the National Coalition for Suicide Prevention.

See also
 LGBT rights in Australia
 Intersex rights by country
 Intersex human rights

References

External links 

Health charities in Australia
Medical and health organisations based in New South Wales
LGBT health organizations
LGBT organisations in Australia
2007 establishments in Australia
Intersex medical and health organizations
Organizations established in 2007
Suicide in Australia